The BMW 247 engine is an air-cooled flat-twin motorcycle engine with two valves per cylinder, also known as the "airhead" boxer. It was used by BMW in its motorcycles from 1969 to 1995.

The /5 variant was introduced in 1969, /6 in 1974 and the /7 in 1977. Before 1981 the ignition was points ignition. From 1981, introduced in the R80G/S it used electronic ignition, Nikasil cylinders, and a lighter flywheel.

A number of different models were on the market:
CS: the Classic Sport, with a  engine.
GS: Gelände/Straße - winner of a number of the Dakar rallies.
RS: Renn (Racing) Sport
RT: Road Touring
S: with the  R90S
ST: [Straße]. An  road-styled G/S.

Subsequent to the type 247 motor, BMW also built other air-cooled flat twin engines known as the Typ 248/1 used for the R45, the R65 and the R65LS BMW motorcycles. Before that they built side-valve and OHV engines commencing with the R32 of 1923. After the type 247, BMW substantially changed the engine design to include partial oil cooling and four valves per cylinder, a design which was to become known as the "oilhead".

References

247, BMW
247 engine
Boxer engines